The Atlantic Bowls Championships was a lawn bowling competition held between national bowls organisations in the Atlantic region. The event was a qualifying event for the World Outdoor Bowls Championships until the 2021 announcement that it would no longer be held. Originally the Championships were for women only and were called the Atlantic Rim Championships. In 2007 men competed for the first time at the event.

The 2001 tournament due to be held in Namibia was cancelled due to opposition from the Namibia Sports Commission. The next tournament was held in 2005.

In 2021, the 2020 World Outdoor Bowls Championship was officially cancelled due to the COVID-19 pandemic. World Bowls then decided that the World Championships would take place every two years starting in 2023. This also resulted in the fact that qualifying events for the Championships were no longer required meaning the Atlantic Championships and Asia Pacific Bowls Championships were terminated.

1993 Florida, United States
Inaugural event held at Sun City Center 19–31 October. For women only and medals determined by round robin.

1995 Durban, South Africa
18-30 April, for women only and medals determined by round robin.

1997 Llandrindod Wells, Wales
22 August-2 September, for women only and medals determined by round robin of 12 teams.

1999 Cape Town, South Africa
Goodwood BC, 21–28 March, for women only. The tournament grew from 12 teams to 16 teams and was organised into two groups of eight, with the winners of each group meeting in the final.

2005 Bangor, Northern Ireland
Ward Park, 13–23 August. For women only and only one bronze medal awarded.

2007 Ayr, Scotland
Ayr Northfield BC - 13–22 July 2007, third place playoffs determined bronze medal.

2009 Johannesburg, South Africa
The Wanderers 3–16 May 2009

2011 Paphos, Cyprus
Athena Beach Hotel, 17–30 October 2011

2015 Paphos, Cyprus
Athena Beach Hotel, 30 November - 13 December

2019 Cardiff, Wales
Barry Athletic BC, Dinas Powys BC, Penarth Windsor BC, Penylan BC, 10–23 May

See also
World Bowls Events

References

Bowls competitions